Grenchenberg tunnel, Mont-de-Granges tunnel or Grenchenbergtunnel is a railway tunnel built between 1911 and 1915 connecting the town of Grenchen (SO) to Moutier (currently still in the Bernese Jura).

This rail link is of considerable importance since it is a passage from the Swiss plateau to the geographical Jura and Basel (Rhine town representing one of the strategic centers of the cross-border alliance "RegioTriRhena").

France having lost Alsace in 1871, international trains connecting France to Switzerland and Italy then took the Belfort-Berne axis, passing through Porrentruy, Delémont and Moutier. This tunnel should make it easier for them to reach the Swiss plateau. The French government contributed 10 million Swiss francs at the total cost of 26 million Swiss francs.

From 2003 to 2008, the tunnel was refurbished.

Characteristics 
 Tunnel length: 8,578 meters
 Length of the Moutier-Lengnau line: 13 km
 Owner of the Moutier-Lengnau line: BLS

Railway tunnels in Switzerland
Grenchen
Buildings and structures in the canton of Bern
Transport in the canton of Bern
Buildings and structures in the canton of Solothurn
Transport in the canton of Solothurn
Tunnels completed in 1915
1915 establishments in Switzerland

References